Haskell School is a historic school building located at Troy in Rensselaer County, New York.  It was built in 1894 and is a "T"-shaped, three story, red brick building on an elevated limestone basement in the Renaissance Revival style.  It has a flat roof with a massive metal cornice.  It features a majestic front entrance with a gated arch rising two stories over a tiled vestibule.  The arch includes the inscription "Haskell School" in a terra cotta frieze.  It was used as a school until 1975, then converted to apartments after 1977.

It was listed on the National Register of Historic Places in 2003.

The former Haskell School, a three-story brick building that has been empty for much of the last 45 years, has a new owner. In May 2020, the building was purchased by an investor, ST8 Realty and Development, led by Dillon Nash, intent on converting the building into 20 residential apartments. “This building was once a community cornerstone, and we’re focused on making sure its best days are still ahead. This neighborhood has so much history and we’re here to support its revitalization. Haskell is finally in the right hands.”

References

School buildings on the National Register of Historic Places in New York (state)
Renaissance Revival architecture in New York (state)
School buildings completed in 1894
Buildings and structures in Rensselaer County, New York
National Register of Historic Places in Troy, New York